Broxton is a village and civil parish in the unitary authority of Cheshire West and Chester and the ceremonial county of Cheshire, England. The village is 11 miles south of Chester, and only 10 miles east of Wrexham in Wales. The civil parish also contains the small settlements of Barnhill, Bolesworth, Brown Knowl, Fuller's Moor and Meadow Bank. According to the 2001 Census it had a total population of 390, increasing to 461 at the 2011 census.

Notable residents

Harry Atkinson, premier of New Zealand on four occasions during the late 19th century was born in Broxton. 
Austin Carr, cricketer, was born at Lower Hall, in Broxton in 1898.
Roger Moore, actor, lived at Broxton Hall during his marriage to singer Dorothy Squires, which lasted from 1953 to 1968.

See also

Listed buildings in Broxton, Cheshire
Broxton Old Hall

References

External links

Villages in Cheshire
Civil parishes in Cheshire